Charles A. Hoxie (1867–1941) creator of the pallophotophone at General Electric, and is credited as one of the inventors of sound film, and as father of the "talking picture".

During his career (1912–32) at General Electric, he devised a sound-on-film process to put recordings on film.

See also
Pallophotophone
History of multitrack recording
List of film formats
List of film sound systems
History of sound recording

References

1867 births
1941 deaths
Television pioneers